The Interstate Highways in Kansas are the segments of the Dwight D. Eisenhower National System of Interstate and Defense Highways within the U.S. state of Kansas.


Primary highways

Auxiliary highways

See also

References

External links

 Kansas Highway Maps: Current, Historic, KDOT

 
Interstate